Plinthograptis rhytisma is a species of moth of the family Tortricidae. It is found in Nigeria.

The length of the forewings is about 4 mm. The ground colour of the forewings is glossy whitish grey with an orange costal belt, spotted with brown. There are two similarly colored blotches, scaled with brownish internally. There is also a red pattern. The hindwings are grey.

References

Endemic fauna of Nigeria
Moths described in 1981
Tortricini
Moths of Africa
Taxa named by Józef Razowski